Garrison Johnson (born July 27, 1988) is an American former professional basketball player. He played college basketball for Jackson State University and later professionally in Europe.

College career
Johnson is best known for his collegiate career at Jackson State University between 2006 and 2010. During his time at Jackson State, Johnson scored 1,251 points and participated in two postseason tournaments: the 2007 NCAA Tournament as a freshman and the 2010 National Invitation Tournament as a senior. Throughout his four-year tenure he steadily increased his scoring averages – 2.7, 7.4, 10.7, and 17.6 points per game. In 2009–10, his senior season, Johnson led the Southwestern Athletic Conference (SWAC) in points per game (18.1), total points (578), free throws (161) and free throw attempts (220). He was named the SWAC Player of the Year, becoming the fifth Jackson State player to earn that honor.

Professional career
After graduating, Johnson was selected in the 2010 NBA Development League Draft by the Springfield Armor in the seventh round. Johnson never played in the D-League, so he began his professional career overseas. In January 2011, he joined Barreirense in Portugal. In 12 games, he averaged 17.6 points and 2.8 rebounds per game.

In November 2011, Johnson signed with Valur in the Icelandic Úrvalsdeild karla, replacing Curry Collins. He was released by the club in end of January 2012 at his own request after appearing in 7 league games where he averaged 21.6 and 5.7 rebounds.

Later life
After his professional career ended, he was hired as a basketball coach at South Cobb High School in Austell, Georgia.

References

External links
Icelandic statistics at Icelandic Basketball Association
Statistics at Proballers.com
College statistics at Sports Reference
Profile at Eurobasket.com

1988 births
Living people
American expatriate basketball people in Iceland
American expatriate basketball people in Portugal
American men's basketball players
Barreirense Basket players
Basketball players from Georgia (U.S. state)
Jackson State Tigers basketball players
People from Austell, Georgia
People from Smyrna, Georgia
Shooting guards
Sportspeople from Cobb County, Georgia
Úrvalsdeild karla (basketball) players
Valur men's basketball players